Barat Ali Batoor is a professional freelancer photographer from Afghanistan. He started his professional career in 2002.

Early life and photography
Barat Ali Batoor was born in 1983, to a family Hazara in Afghanistan.
He took part in the documentary photography project funded by the Open Society Institute. A photograph titled 'The First Day at Sea' he took of a boat journey to Australia won the prestigious 2013 Nikon-Walkley Photo of the Year.

See also
List of Hazara people

References

External links
 
 

1983 births
Living people
Hazara people
Hazara artists
Photography in Afghanistan